Bakaly is the name of several rural localities in Russia:
Bakaly, Bakalinsky District, Republic of Bashkortostan, a selo in Bakalinsky District of the Republic of Bashkortostan
Bakaly, Burayevsky District, Republic of Bashkortostan, a village in Burayevsky District of the Republic of Bashkortostan
Bakaly, Republic of Tatarstan, a village in Bavlinsky District of the Republic of Tatarstan